Here I Am is the debut studio album by German singer-songwriter Gil Ofarim, released on May 25, 1998. Two singles were released from the album, "Round 'n' Round (It Goes)" and "If You Only Knew", featuring Canadian band the Moffatts.

Track listing

Charts

References

External links
 Here I Am on Discogs

1998 debut albums